Ernest-Antoine Seillière de Laborde (born 20 December 1937 in Neuilly-sur-Seine) is a French entrepreneur and the heir to the Wendel empire (representing €730 million).

He is a member of Le Siècle think tank, an officer of the Légion d'honneur, and an officer of the Ordre National du Mérite. Contrary to popular belief, he is not a member of the French nobility and is therefore not a French baron (although his title is said to be authentic but papal).

His great-grandfather, Aimé Seillière (1835–1870) was married to Marie de Laborde (1844–1867) in 1865. His paternal grandfather is the French academician Ernest Seillière.

Career 
He graduated from the Institut d'Études Politiques de Paris, studying in law and a former pupil of the École nationale d'administration. Vice President of the CNPF and member of its executive council from 1988 to 1997, President of the economic commission of the CNPF from 1988 to 1994, he became president of Medef (formerly CNPF) from December 1997 to 5 June 2005. He was CEO of Wendel, a holding company for the CGIP, chairman of the Supervisory Board from 2002 to March 2013, Honorary chairman since then. Seillière is close to the Traditionalist Catholics, in particular of the abbé Laguérie.

He is a former member of the Steering Committee of the Bilderberg Group and participated in all their conferences between 1979 and 1987 as well as 1992 and 2002.

In 1990 and 2000 he was one of the top big linkers in the French corporate network

At Medef 
He succeeded Jean Gandois as leader of the CNPF in December 1997, after the dismissal of the appeal for cut in 35 hours by the  Socialist government. The union then took a more conservative direction, which was led by Denis Kessler, and changed its name. He retired after seven years as leader. Laurence Parisot succeeded him on 5 July 2005. Since winter 2005, Ernest-Antoine Seillière has been President of UNICE (renamed "BusinessEurope" in Janvier 2007), the federation of European business, based in Brussels.

Publications 
In March 2012, he published a book entitled "On n'est pas là pour se faire engueuler..." ("We are not here to be yelled at"), in which he analyzes the financial crisis, based on his experience as head of Medef and BusinessEurope. He also exposes his vision of France and Europe's future and shares some personal memories.

References

External links 
 French Lessons, Campden Family Business, 14 June 2012

Bibliography 

1937 births
Living people
Members of the Steering Committee of the Bilderberg Group
People from Neuilly-sur-Seine
French people of Lorrainian descent
French businesspeople
Lycée Janson-de-Sailly alumni
Sciences Po alumni
École nationale d'administration alumni
European Union lobbyists
Commandeurs of the Légion d'honneur
Officers of the Ordre national du Mérite